William Robertson Desobry (September 11, 1918 – January 12, 1996) was a senior U.S. Army field commander in Germany during the Cold War, and a Lieutenant General in the United States Army.  General Desobry was a decorated hero from World War II, and played a significant role as an advisor to the Republic of Vietnam Army and on the Army Staff during the Vietnam War.  In addition to commanding a division and corps, he was the Commanding General of the Armor Center and was the President of the Tank Task Force, which led to the creation of the M1 Abrams.

After 34 years in the Army and service in two wars, Lieutenant General Desobry completed his military career in 1975.

Education
Desobry received a Bachelor of Science degree in 1941 from Georgetown University, where he was a distinguished graduate of their Reserve Officer Training Corps program and earned a Regular Army commission.

Early life and career
Born in Manila, the Philippine Islands in 1918, Desobry was the son of Colonel and Mrs. Elmer C. Desobry.  He attended high schools in Chicago, Illinois, and Honolulu, Hawaii–graduating from Punahou Academy in 1936.  John McManus described Desobry, "Rail-thin at six-feet-four and one-hundred-sixty pounds, he was the son of a career soldier. He qualified as something of a family rebel because he had elected to go to Georgetown University instead of West Point. He had graduated in 1941 with an ROTC (Reserve Officers' Training Corps) commission. Although
he had only been in the Army four years, he had deployed overseas as commander of the 20th Armored Infantry Battalion because of his natural leadership skills. His subsequent performance in combat only enhanced his fine reputation. Now he found himself in charge of 325 soldiers and fifteen tanks in a mixed task force generally known as 'Team Desobry.'"

World War II

General Desobry's service during World War II included a tour of duty with the 29th Infantry Regiment at Fort Benning, Georgia and the 10th Armored Division in CONUS, and the European Theater of Operations.  He commanded an armored infantry battalion task force during the defense of Bastogne, and was wounded and hospitalized by the Germans at Ibbenburen, Germany.  He was liberated in the spring of 1945 after imprisonment at Falingbostel, Germany, a branch of the Belsen prison camp, and at Brunswick, Germany.
Charles MacDonald, noted Army historian and Battle of the Bulge veteran, described then Major Desobry's heroic actions in his 1997 book, A Time for Trumpets.  It is arguably the definitive account of this dramatic victory and displays the actions of Desobry and his armored-infantrymen, often in close combat and at times in hand-to-hand combat.

The road between Noville and Bourcy, which Team Desobry held briefly during the defense of Bastogne, was renamed Rue de Général Desobry in his honor.

Post-war service
Upon his return to the United States, Lieutenant Colonel Desobry served for short periods at Fort Rucker and Fort McClellan, Alabama and in G2, Department of the Army.  In July 1946, he returned to Europe where he served as an Assistant G1 in Headquarters, Third Army and US Forces in Austria.

Upon his return to the United States in 1950, he attended the Command and General Staff College at Fort Leavenworth, Kansas and subsequently served four years on the faculty.

He returned to Germany in 1955 and served as Commanding Officer, Combat Command C, 2d Armored Division, and later Chief of Staff, 2d Armored Division and G3, V Corps. Upon his return to the United States in 1958, he attended the National War College, graduating in 1959. He was then assigned to the Office Chief of Legislative Liaison, where he served for three years in the Plans and Projects Division.

In 1962 he was assigned to the faculty of the Army War College, Carlisle Barracks, Pennsylvania, where he served as a Course Director, Chairman of a Faculty Group, and the Chairman of the Department of Strategy.

Vietnam War

From August 1965 to June 1966, Colonel Desobry was assigned to Headquarters Military Assistance Command, Vietnam (MAC-V) with duty as Deputy Senior Advisor to the ARVN IV Corps in the delta region of Vietnam under Colonel George Barton.  On June 3, 1966, Brigadier General Desobry assumed duties as the Senior Advisor to the ARVN IV Corps.  Desobry and his advisory teams were involved in four campaigns during his two and a half years tour: Defense; and Counter-Offensive Phases 1–3.  IV Corps was the southernmost of the four major military and administrative units of South Vietnam in the 1960s and early 1970s. Its headquarters were located at Cần Thơ in the Mekong Delta. Also known as Military Region 4 (MR 4), IV Corps was the fourth allied tactical combat zone. Because of the nature of its terrain, and more important, its geographical isolation from major North Vietnamese strongholds, the Delta area had generally been infiltrated by enemy guerrilla or small force rather than large force bands. Thus, except for the Mobile 3 Riverine Force and small Special Forces units, no U.S. troops had normally operated in the area until Operation Deckhouse V in 1967 when the U.S. 9th Infantry Division  initiated two years of intensive antiguerrilla activities. Otherwise, MR 4 had been and continued to be primarily a Vietnamese area of operations.  Brigadier General Desobry turned over his duties to Major General George S. Eckhardt, and left Vietnam on January 14, 1968, only three weeks before the Tet Offensive.

Cold War service

Following over two years as Senior Advisor to the ARVN IV Corps, Brigadier General Desobry became the Director of Army Operations, The Army Staff. Major General Desobry then served as Commanding General of the 1st Armored Division at Fort Hood, Texas from 1969 to 1971. In 1971, he became the Commanding General of the Armor Center and Armor School at Fort Knox, Kentucky.  While there, he was appointed President of the XM1 Tank Task Force, which led to the M1 Abrams.

In 1968, Desobry returned to Washington, D. C. where he served as a member of the Department of the Army Board of Inquiry on the Army Logistics System; the Chief of the Coordination Division, Office of the Chief of Staff, and subsequently as Executive Officer to the Vice Chief of Staff, U. S. Army.

On June 1, 1973, Lieutenant General Desobry assumed command of V Corps at Frankfurt, Federal Republic of Germany from Lieutenant General Willard Pearson. He was responsible for the training and readiness of V Corps, headquartered at Abrams Barracks, which included the 8th Infantry Division (Mechanized) "Pathfinder," the 3rd Armored Division "Spearhead," and the 11th Armored Cavalry Regiment "Blackhorse." Major General Joseph C. McDonough commanded the "Pathfinder" Division, which was headquartered at Rose Barracks, Bad Kreuznach. Major General Jonathan R. "Jack" Burton commanded the "Spearhead" Division headquartered at Frankfurt. Colonel (later Lieutenant General) Robert L. Schweitzer (1973-1974) and Colonel (later Lieutenant General) John L. Ballantyne III (1974-1976) commanded the "Blackhorse" Regiment headquartered at Fulda.

Desobry turned over command of V Corps to Lieutenant General Robert L. Fair on August 24, 1975.

Retirement
Lieutenant General Desobry continued to support the Armor community after his retirement from Army.  As a result, he received the U.S. Cavalry and Armor Association's Gold Medallion Winners Hall of Fame in 1989.

Desobry died on January 12, 1996, in San Antonio, Texas. He is buried at the Fort Sam Houston National Cemetery

Personal life
General Desobry was married to the former Jacqueline Keyes of San Antonio, Texas, on August 22, 1942.  They had six children.
Mrs. Desobry died in San Antonio on September 10, 2011.

Rank earned

Awards and decorations
General Desobry's awards include the Distinguished Service Medal with Oak Leaf Cluster, Silver Star, Legion of Merit with four Oak Leaf Clusters, Bronze Star Medal, Purple Heart, Air Medal (10 awards), Prisoner of War Medal, Combat Infantryman's Badge, and Army Staff Identification Badge.  His foreign awards include the French Croix de Guerre with 2 Silver Palms and 1 Bronze Palm, Belgian Croix de Guerre with Palm,  French Legion of Honour, German Verdienstkreuz, Vietnamese Cross of Gallantry with Gold and Bronze Stars, and the Vietnam Armed Forces Honor Medal (1st Class).

Assignment history
1941: Graduation from Georgetown University Army Reserve Officer Training Corps Program, Washington, D.C.
1943: Commander, 20th Armored Infantry Battalion, 10th Armored Division
1944: Commander, "Team Desobry"—a battalion-sized tank-infantry task force of the 10th Armored Division—Noville, Belgium
1945: Prisoner of War
1951: Graduate, Army Command and General Staff College, Fort Leavenworth, Kansas
1954: Commander, Combat Command C, 2d Armored Division
1959: Graduate, National War College, Fort McNair, Washington, D.C.
1965: Deputy Senior Advisor, IV ARVN Corps, Republic of Vietnam
1966: Senior Advisor, IV ARVN Corps, Republic of Vietnam
1968: Director of Operations, Deputy Chief of Staff for Military Operations, U.S. Army, Washington, D.C.
1969: Commanding General, 1st Armored Division, Fort Hood, Texas
1971: Commanding General, U.S. Army Armor Center and School, Fort Knox, Kentucky
1973: Commanding General, V Corps, Frankfurt, Federal Republic of Germany
1975: Retired from active service

See also
 1st Armored Division (United States)
 V Corps (United States)

References

Further reading

1918 births
1999 deaths
United States Army personnel of World War II
United States Army generals
Recipients of the Silver Star
Recipients of the Legion of Merit
United States Army Command and General Staff College alumni
Recipients of the Cross of the Order of Merit of the Federal Republic of Germany
Punahou School alumni
National War College alumni
Military personnel from San Antonio
People from Manila
United States Army personnel of the Vietnam War
American expatriates in the Philippines